The 2023 Challenge Tour is the 35th season of the Challenge Tour, the official development tour to the European Tour. The tour started as the Satellite Tour with its first Order of Merit rankings in 1989 and was officially renamed as the Challenge Tour at the start of the 1990 season.

Schedule
The following table lists official events during the 2023 season.

See also
2023 European Tour
2022–23 Sunshine Tour

Notes

References

External links
Schedule on the European Tour's official site
Rankings on the European Tour's official site

2023
2023 in golf
Challenge Tour